Events from the year 1881 in Germany.

Incumbents

National level
 Kaiser – William I
 Chancellor – Otto von Bismarck

State level

Kingdoms
 King of Bavaria – Ludwig II of Bavaria
 King of Prussia – Kaiser William I
 King of Saxony – Albert of Saxony
 King of Württemberg – Charles I of Württemberg

Grand Duchies
 Grand Duke of Baden – Frederick I
 Grand Duke of Hesse – Louis IV
 Grand Duke of Mecklenburg-Schwerin – Frederick Francis II
 Grand Duke of Mecklenburg-Strelitz – Frederick William
 Grand Duke of Oldenburg – Peter II
 Grand Duke of Saxe-Weimar-Eisenach – Charles Alexander

Principalities
 Schaumburg-Lippe – Adolf I, Prince of Schaumburg-Lippe
 Schwarzburg-Rudolstadt – George Albert, Prince of Schwarzburg-Rudolstadt
 Schwarzburg-Sondershausen – Charles Gonthier, Prince of Schwarzburg-Sondershausen
 Principality of Lippe – Woldemar, Prince of Lippe
 Reuss Elder Line – Heinrich XXII, Prince Reuss of Greiz
 Reuss Younger Line – Heinrich XIV, Prince Reuss Younger Line
 Waldeck and Pyrmont – George Victor, Prince of Waldeck and Pyrmont

Duchies
 Duke of Anhalt – Frederick I, Duke of Anhalt
 Duke of Brunswick – William, Duke of Brunswick
 Duke of Saxe-Altenburg – Ernst I, Duke of Saxe-Altenburg
 Duke of Saxe-Coburg and Gotha – Ernst II, Duke of Saxe-Coburg and Gotha
 Duke of Saxe-Meiningen – Georg II, Duke of Saxe-Meiningen

Events
 31 March – last Anti-Socicalist Law is passed by the German Reichstag.
 16 May – Gross-Lichterfelde Tramway, world's first electric tramway, starts in Berlin.
 25 September – in Meckesheim physician Ferdinand Adolf Kehrer performs the first modern Caesarean section, the transverse incision technique to minimise bleeding. 
 27 October – German federal election, 1881

Births

 1 January – Hermann Schmitz, German industrialist (died 1960)
 4 January – Wilhelm Lehmbruck, German sculptor (died 1919)
 17 January – Karl Scharnagl, German politician (died 1963)
 16 February – Hans Vogel, German politician (died 1945)
 16 February – Hans Meiser, German Protestant theologian, pastor and first 'Landesbischof' of the Evangelical Lutheran Church in Bavaria (died 1956)
 23 March – Hermann Staudinger, German chemist (died 1965)
 1 April – Wilhelm Sollmann. German journalist and politician (died 1951)
 3 April – Hans Kniep, German botanist (died 1930)
 19 April – Ernst Schneppenhorst, German politician (died 1945)
 2 May – Ernst Legal, German actor (died 1955)
 18 May – Erwin Madelung, German mathematician (died 1972)
 30 May – Georg von Küchler, German field marshal (died 1968)
 31 May – Heinrich Burger, German figure skater (died 1942)
 9 June – Felix von Luckner, German author, sailor and nobleman (died 1966)
 24 June – Heinz Tietjen, German conductor (died 1967)
 29 June – Gottlob Walz, German diver (died 1943)
 27 July – Hans Fischer, German chemist and Nobel Prize laureate (died 1945)
 28 July – Günther Quandt, German industrialist (died 1954)
 8 August – Paul Ludwig Ewald von Kleist, German field marshal (died 1954)
 26 August – Franz Gürtner, German jurist and politician (died 1941)
 4 October – Walther von Brauchitsch, German field marshal (died 1948)
 9 October – Friedrich Syrup, German politician (died 1945)
 12 November – Ulrich von Hassell, German diplomat (died 1944)
 12 November – Maximilian von Weichs, German field marshal (died 1954)
 2 December – Heinrich Barkhausen, German physicist (died 1956)
 4 December – Erwin von Witzleben, German officer (died 1944)
 15 December – Eugen Bolz, German politician (died 1945)
 25 December – Christian Hülsmeyer, German inventor, physicist and entrepreneur (died 1957)
 31 December – Max Pechstein, German painter (died 1955)

Deaths

 7 April – Johann Hinrich Wichern, German religious leader (born 1808)
 15 May – Franz von Dingelstedt, German poet and dramatist (born 1814)
 2 June – Friedrich Albrecht zu Eulenburg, German diplomat (born 1815)
 23 June – Matthias Jakob Schleiden, German botanist (born 1804)
 10 July – Georg Hermann Nicolai, German architect (born 1812)
 11 October – Friedrich Hitzig, German architect (born 1811)

References

 
Years of the 19th century in Germany
Germany
Germany